During the 2013–14 season, Bury competed in the fourth tier of English football, Football League Two.

Season summary

League table

First-team squad

Out on loan

Results and fixtures

Pre-season friendlies

League One

FA Cup

League Cup

Football League Trophy

Transfers

Transfers in

Loans in

Out

Loans out

References

Bury F.C. seasons
Bury